Matisse Vincent Thybulle (born March 4, 1997) is an Australian-American professional basketball player for the Portland Trail Blazers of the National Basketball Association (NBA). He was selected in the first round of the 2019 NBA draft by the Boston Celtics before being traded to the Philadelphia 76ers the following day. He was named to the NBA All-Defensive Second Team in 2021 and 2022.

Thybulle played college basketball for the Washington Huskies. As a senior in 2019, he was recognized as the top defender in the nation with the Naismith Defensive Player of the Year and the Lefty Driesell Award. Thybulle also earned first-team all-conference honors in the Pac-12, and repeated as the Pac-12 Defensive Player of the Year.

Thybulle is a dual American-Australian citizen and spent around seven years of his childhood in Sydney. He was a member of the Australian national team at the 2020 Summer Olympics in Tokyo.

Early life
Thybulle was born in Scottsdale, Arizona, the son of Greg, a Haitian-born engineer raised in the Harlem neighborhood of New York, and Dr. Elizabeth Thybulle, a naturopath who died of leukemia in 2015. He was named after French artist Henri Matisse. When he was two, his family moved to Sydney, Australia, where they lived for around seven years. The Thybulle family lived in Sydney's North Shore while in Australia and the children attended elementary school at North Sydney Demonstration School. Matisse did not play much basketball in Australia and focused more on swimming while there, where he said lifeguards "were a really big deal". His family returned to the U.S. in 2005 and settled in Sammamish, Washington, a suburb east of Seattle.

Thybulle could not make layups consistently until around the eighth grade, when his coordination began matching his speed. He attended Skyline High School for two years, then transferred to nearby Eastside Catholic, where he was ranked a four-star recruit by Scout.com and three-star by ESPN, and graduated in 2015.

College career
Thybulle chose to attend the University of Washington in Seattle based on his relationship with Huskies coach Lorenzo Romar. He started all 34 games as a true freshman in 2015–16, averaging 6.2 points, 3.2 rebounds, and 1.6 assists in 24.1 minutes per game.

Thybulle considered leaving the program after his coach left.  However, he decided to return for 2017–18 after meeting with new coach Mike Hopkins. The former 22-year Syracuse assistant under Jim Boeheim sold him on the Orange's acclaimed 2–3 zone defense that he planned to install at Washington. On February 17, Thybulle scored a career-high 26 points in an 82–59 win over Colorado. Possessing a  wingspan, he was instrumental to the Huskies' zone defense, which was a key to the team's first 20-win season since 2011–12. He was named the Pac-12 Defensive Player of the Year, becoming the first player in school history to receive the honor. Thybulle averaged a career-high 11.2 points per game, set a Huskies single-season record with 101 steals, and led Washington with a team-leading 49 blocks. He became the second player in Pac-12 history with at least 90 steals and 40 blocks in the same season, joining Jeff Trepagnier (USC, 1999–2000).

In 2018–19, Thybulle had 17 points, six steals and five blocks in a 64–55 home win over Colorado to help the Huskies clinch a share of the Pac-12 regular season title. Including a win earlier in the week against Utah, he averaged 13.5 points, 6.0 steals, 4.5 blocks and 5.0 rebounds to earn Pac-12 Player of the Week honors for the first time in his career. Thybulle won the Naismith Defensive Player of the Year and Lefty Driesell Award as the top defensive player in the nation. He was also named first-team All-Pac-12, and became the second player in conference history to repeat as Pac-12 Defensive Player of the Year. He led all NCAA Division I players with 126 steals, which also broke the Pac-12 single-season record held previously by Jason Kidd. Thybulle also ranked eighth nationally with 83 blocks, becoming the only player in the past two decades to record at least 100 steals and 80 blocks. With averages of 3.5 steals and 2.3 blocks per game, he was one of three players in the last 20 years to average at least 2.0 steals and 2.0 blocks in a season. Thybulle also passed Gary Payton to become the conference leader in career steals with 331, and was the first in Pac-12 history with two 100-steal seasons. He also tied Washington's career blocks record of 186 held by Chris Welp, and he is the only player in Huskies history ranked in the top 10 in both career steals and blocks.

Professional career

Philadelphia 76ers (2019–2023)
The Philadelphia 76ers targeted Thybulle leading up to the 2019 NBA draft. They were coming off a second-round playoff loss to the eventual NBA champions, the Toronto Raptors, and were seeking someone who could immediately contribute to their goal of a championship. The 76ers had Thybulle stop working out for other teams, promising in exchange to select him in the first round with their No. 24 overall pick. They effectively ended up moving up to No. 20 to select him, receiving his draft rights from the Boston Celtics in a trade for Philadelphia's 24th and 33rd picks. On July 3, 2019, Thybulle signed with the 76ers. On October 23, he made his debut in NBA, coming off from bench in a 107–93 win over the Celtics with three points, a rebound, an assist, two steals and two blocks. After scoring 20 points, hitting five three-pointers, and making three steals in a win over the Raptors on December 8, he joined Allen Iverson as the only Sixers rookies to record five threes and three steals in a game since 1983. On July 11, 2020, Thybulle started uploading a series of vlog style YouTube videos showcasing the 2020 NBA Bubble at the ESPN Wide World of Sports Complex in Orlando, Florida.

In his second season in 2020–21, Thybulle was named to the NBA All-Defensive Second Team, though he only averaged 20 minutes per game. He was the NBA leader with 3.8 steals per 100 possessions as well as 5.6 deflections per 36 minutes.

On October 29, 2021, the 76ers picked up Thybulle's team option, extending his contract through the 2022–23 season.

Portland Trail Blazers (2023–present) 
On February 9, 2023, Thybulle was traded to the Portland Trail Blazers in a four-team trade involving the Charlotte Hornets and New York Knicks. He made his Trail Blazers debut on February 13, recording 14 points, six rebounds, two assists and three blocks in a 127–115 win over the Los Angeles Lakers.

National team career
Thybulle is a dual citizen of Australia as well as the United States and is therefore eligible to represent either national team. When asked if he would represent the Australian Boomers at the 2020 Tokyo Olympics, Thybulle said he was proud of his Australian roots but would not presume he would earn automatic selection.

On February 3, 2021, Thybulle was named as part of the Australian Boomers squad for the delayed 2020 Tokyo Olympics, which began immediately after the 2021 NBA Finals.
Thybulle helped Australia to obtain their first ever Olympic medal in men's basketball, beating Slovenia in the bronze medal game.

Career statistics

NBA

Regular season

|-
| style="text-align:left;"| 
| style="text-align:left;"| Philadelphia
| 65 || 14 || 19.8 || .423 || .357 || .610 || 1.6 || 1.2 || 1.4 || .7 || 4.7
|-
| style="text-align:left;"| 
| style="text-align:left;"| Philadelphia
| 65 || 8 || 20.0 || .420 || .301 || .444 || 1.9 || 1.0 || 1.6 || 1.1 || 3.9
|-
| style="text-align:left;"| 
| style="text-align:left;"| Philadelphia
| 66 || 50 || 25.5 || .500 || .313 || .791 || 2.3 || 1.1 || 1.7 || 1.1 || 5.7
|-
| style="text-align:left;"| 
| style="text-align:left;"| Philadelphia
| 49 || 6 || 12.1 || .431 || .333 || .750 || 1.3 || .5 || .9 || .3 || 2.7
|- class="sortbottom"
| style="text-align:center;" colspan="2"| Career
| 245 || 78 || 19.8 || .448 || .325 || .667 || 1.8 || 1.0 || 1.5 || .8 || 4.4

Playoffs

|-
| style="text-align:left;"| 2020
| style="text-align:left;"| Philadelphia
| 4 || 1 || 18.8 || .429 || .250 || — || 1.8 || .5 || .8 || .3 || 1.8
|-
| style="text-align:left;"| 2021
| style="text-align:left;"| Philadelphia
| 12 || 1 || 18.3 || .481 || .324 || .400 || 1.4 || .3 || 1.3 || .9 || 5.3
|-
| style="text-align:left;"| 2022
| style="text-align:left;"| Philadelphia
| 9 || 0 || 15.2 || .458 || .286 || .333 || 1.0 || .4 || .8 || .8 || 3.0
|- class="sortbottom"
| style="text-align:center;" colspan="2"| Career
| 25 || 2 || 17.3 || .470 || .308 || .375 || 1.3 || .4 || 1.0 || .8 || 3.9

College

|-
| style="text-align:left;"| 2015–16
| style="text-align:left;"| Washington
| 34 || 34 || 24.1 || .397 || .366 || .714 || 3.2 || 1.6 || 1.1 || .9 || 6.2
|-
| style="text-align:left;"| 2016–17
| style="text-align:left;"| Washington
| 31 || 31 || 29.9 || .448 || .405 || .841 || 3.1 || 1.8 || 2.1 || .7 || 10.5
|-
| style="text-align:left;"| 2017–18
| style="text-align:left;"| Washington
| 34 || 33 || 32.3 || .445 || .365 || .714 || 2.9 || 2.6 || 3.0 || 1.4 || 11.2
|-
| style="text-align:left;"| 2018–19
| style="text-align:left;"| Washington
| 36 || 36 || 31.1 || .415 || .305 || .851 || 3.1 || 2.1 || style="background:#cfecec;"| 3.5* || 2.3 || 9.1
|- class="sortbottom"
| style="text-align:center;" colspan="2"| Career
| 135 || 134 || 29.4 || .429 || .358 || .782 || 3.1 || 2.0 || 2.4 || 1.4 || 9.2

Personal life 
Thybulle is Catholic, having been confirmed as a child.  

On April 10, 2022, it went public that Thybulle was not fully vaccinated for COVID-19.  This made him ineligible to play in Canada during the 76ers opening round of the NBA playoffs against the Toronto Raptors. “Yeah, I’m not fully vaccinated,” he told The Athletic’s Rich Hofmann. “This was a decision I made a long time ago. I thought a lot about what I would say here. Essentially I made this choice and I thought I can keep it to myself, I can keep it private, but people are always going to wonder why.”  Thybulle, who said that he was brought up in a "holistic household" with "Chinese medicine and naturopathic doctors" did say that he had received the first dose of the Pfizer vaccine but did not continue on for the following shot.

See also
 List of NCAA Division I men's basketball season steals leaders
 List of NCAA Division I men's basketball career steals leaders

Notes

References

External links

 
 Washington Huskies bio

1997 births
Living people
African-American Catholics
American emigrants to Australia
American men's basketball players
American sportspeople of Haitian descent
Australian men's basketball players
Australian people of Haitian descent
Australian people of African-American descent
Basketball players at the 2020 Summer Olympics
Basketball players from Scottsdale, Arizona
Basketball players from Washington (state)
Boston Celtics draft picks
Medalists at the 2020 Summer Olympics
National Basketball Association players from Australia
Olympic basketball players of Australia
Olympic bronze medalists for Australia
Olympic medalists in basketball
People from Issaquah, Washington
Philadelphia 76ers players
Portland Trail Blazers players
Shooting guards
Small forwards
Sportspeople from King County, Washington
Washington Huskies men's basketball players